Sant Gervasi Cemetery founded in 1853, is located in the district of Sarrià-Sant Gervasi in Barcelona, Spain. With an extension of 12,229 m², the area divided into two parts by a staircase leading to the cemetery chapel. It includes 4773 plots. Numerous sculptures and ornaments, mainly in the style of eclecticism, decorate the tombs.

Notable interments 
 Xavier Montsalvatge  (1912- 2002), Spanish composer
 Joan Maragall (1860-1911), Spanish Catalan poet, journalist and translator
 Darío de Regoyos (1857-1913), painter
 Felip Pedrell (1841-1922), composer
 Lluís Domènech i Montaner (1850-1923), Catalan architect who was highly influential on Modernisme català
 Enric Clarasó (1857-1941), modernist Catalan sculptor 
 Joan Lamote de Grignon (1872-1949),  pianist, composer and orchestra director 
 Josep Guinovart (1927-2007), painter

References 

Cemeteries in Catalonia
Buildings and structures in Barcelona